Martin Burkert (born 14 October 1964) is a German politician and member of the SPD.

Political career
Burkert was born in Würzburg. He has been a member of the German Bundestag since the 2013 national elections. He has since been serving on the Committee on Transport and, from 2013 on, the Committee on Transport and Digital Infrastructure; he chaired the committee from 2013 to 2017. In his first term from 2005 until 2009, he was also a member of the Committee on the Environment, Nature Conservation and Nuclear Safety.

In addition to his committee assignments, Burkert served as deputy chairman of the German-Mexican Parliamentary Friendship Group from 2014 until 2019. He was also a member of the German-Brazilian Parliamentary Friendship Group and of the German-Swiss Parliamentary Friendship Group.

Within the SPD parliamentary group, Burkert belonged to the Parliamentary Left, a left-wing movement. He was a member of the working group on municipal policy. From 2010 until 2019, he led the Bundestag group of SPD parliamentarians from Bavaria, one of the largest delegations within the parliamentary group.

Since 2013, Burkert has been serving as deputy chairman of the SPD in Bavaria, under the leadership of successive chairpersons Florian Pronold (2013-2017) and Natascha Kohnen (since 2017).

In the negotiations to form a coalition government under the leadership of Chancellor Angela Merkel following the 2017 federal elections, Burkert was part of the working group on transport and infrastructure, led by Michael Kretschmer, Alexander Dobrindt and Sören Bartol.

By the end of 2019, Burkert resigned from parliament to join the board of railway and transport union EVG. He was replaced by Bela Bach, the next SPD candidate on the party-list.

Other activities

Regulatory agencies
 Federal Network Agency for Electricity, Gas, Telecommunications, Posts and Railway (BNetzA), Member of the Rail Infrastructure Advisory Council (since 2010)

Corporate boards
 Adler Versicherungs AG, member of the supervisory board
 DB Cargo Deutschland, member of the supervisory board
 DEVK, deputy chairman of the supervisory board
 S-Bahn Berlin, member of the supervisory board 
 TeamBank AG, member of the advisory board
 Schultheiss Wohnbau AG, member of the supervisory board (2009-2014)
 Sparda-Bank Nürnberg eG, member of the supervisory board (2005-2010)

Non-profit organizations
 Auto Club Europa (ACE), Member
 Railway and Transport Union (EVG), Member

References

External links 
  
 Bundestag biography 

1964 births
Living people
Politicians from Würzburg
Members of the Bundestag for Bavaria
Members of the Bundestag 2013–2017
Members of the Bundestag 2009–2013
Members of the Bundestag 2005–2009
Members of the Bundestag for the Social Democratic Party of Germany
Recipients of the Cross of the Order of Merit of the Federal Republic of Germany